The 2011 Women's Hockey Champions Trophy was the 19th edition of the Hockey Champions Trophy for women. It was held from 25 June to 3 July 2011 in Amstelveen, Netherlands.

The Netherlands won the tournament for the sixth time after defeating Argentina 3–2 in the final on a penalty shoot-out after a 3–3 draw, tying the record previously set by Australia in 2003 of six titles won. New Zealand won the third place match by defeating Korea 3–2 to claim their first ever Champions Trophy medal.

After the preliminaries were over, the final originally was scheduled to be played between the Netherlands and Korea, but the Argentine side protested against the second round standing in which they were ranked third behind Korea based on goals scored in that round. After a second appeal by the Argentine team, the final day schedule was changed, since the regulations stated that in case of a draw in points in the second round, the total points in the tournament should be the next tie-breaker.

Format
A new format was used for the 2011 tournament, with eight teams participating instead of the traditional six. All temas are split in two groups (pools A and B) and play a round robin. The top two teams advance to Pool C and play for the medals, the bottom two teams play in Pool D for fifth to eighth place. For this second round, points for the game with the advancing team from the same preliminary group are carried over and two games are played against teams from the other group. In the final classification games, the two top teams from Group C play for gold, the third and fourth team for bronze. The two top teams from Group D play for fifth and sixth place, while the third and fourth team of Group D play for seventh and eighth Place.

Teams
The participating teams were determined by International Hockey Federation (FIH):

 (Defending champions and champions of 2010 World Cup)
 (Host nation and champions of 2008 Summer Olympics)
 (Third in 2010 World Cup)
 (Fourth in 2010 World Cup)
 (Fifth in 2010 World Cup)
 (Sixth in 2010 World Cup)
 (Invitational)
 (Invitational)

Squads

Head coach: Carlos Retegui

Head coach: Adam Commens

Head coach: Kim Sang-Ryul

Head coach: Danny Kerry

Head coach: Michael Behrmann

Head coach:  Maximiliano Caldas

Head coach:  Mark Hager

Head coach: Lim Jung-Woo

Umpires
Below are the 11 umpires appointed by the International Hockey Federation:

Stella Bartlema (NED)
Frances Block (ENG)
Elena Eskina (RUS)
Amy Hassick (USA)
Christiane Hippler (GER)
Kelly Hudson (NZL)
Michelle Joubert (RSA)
Miao Lin (CHN)
Irene Presenqui (ARG)
Lisa Roach (AUS)
Chieko Soma (JPN)

Results
All times are Central European Summer Time (UTC+02:00)

First round

Pool A

Pool B

Medal round

Pool C

Argentina was moved to second place after a second appeal.

Non-medal round

Pool D

Classification

Seventh and eighth place

Fifth and sixth place

Third and fourth place

Final

Awards

Statistics

Final standings

Goalscorers

References

External links
Official FIH website
Results book

Women's Hockey Champions Trophy
Champions Trophy
Hockey Champions Trophy
International women's field hockey competitions hosted by the Netherlands
Sports competitions in Amstelveen
Hockey Champions Trophy Women
Hockey Champions Trophy Women